White Mountain, or White Mountain West, is the highest peak in the Salmon River Mountains in Idaho, USA, with an elevation of .

Location

It is named after the bright white rock on the north and west sides of the mountain, although the summit is of gray-brown rock.
It is on the edge of the Frank Church Wilderness and is administered by the Salmon-Challis National Forest.

Description

Class three climbing is required to reach the top.
The east face is the steepest, and rises over the Twin Creek Lakes basin.

Notes

References

Sources

Mountains of Idaho